The Music of Dance Dance Revolution X is a collection of tracks that are playable on Dance Dance Revolution X, a music video game first released in Japan by Konami on December 24, 2008, then later in Europe on June 3, 2009 and North America on June 9, 2009. The soundtracks for the different releases are primarily dance, hip hop, and synthpop based with additional tracks covering multiple other genres.

This mix features the return of several licensed songs from the Dancemania music compilation series, re-edited into new song cuts dubbed "2008 X-edits". It also marks the first arcade DDR appearance of synthpop licenses from A Different Drum Records, which originally made their debut on Dance Dance Revolution Ultramix 2 on Xbox.

Lists of songs
These are the lists of songs across the different releases of Dance Dance Revolution X. They are in release order, then sorted as the songs are organized and displayed in game (otherwise grouped by category and alphabetized). The songs with a padlock are not available in-game until certain conditions are met. A clapperboard indicates that the song has its original, or a custom-made music video that can be seen during play.

Arcade
This is the soundtrack of the arcade release of Dance Dance Revolution X. There are a total of 391 songs (387 in the North American and European releases), 88 for this version.

Course
This is the list of courses on the arcade version. There are 3 types of courses, CONCEPT COURSE, DRILL COURSE, and RANKING COURSE. The color indicates the difficulty played. The number next to the song refers to the song difficulties. Yellow represents Basic. Fuchsia represents Difficult. Green represents Expert. Purple represents Challenge.

Concept Course
The Concept Course is the usually-themed course from previous games. This is considered as a replacement to both Nonstop and Challenge modes.

Drill Course
The Drill Course is used to measure the dance level of players, with each song grows harder as they level up (similar to Danintei Mode from Beatmania IIDX). The courses are also different in Single and Double Play. There is only one difficulty per course.

Ranking Course
As the name implies, this course is used specifically for Internet Ranking.

PlayStation 2

North American Version
This is the soundtrack for the North American PlayStation 2 release of Dance Dance Revolution X. The game was released September 16, 2008.

Japanese Version
This is the soundtrack for the Japanese PlayStation 2 release of Dance Dance Revolution X. The game was released January 29, 2009.

Differences
Due to licensing issues on certain music, in the North American and European arcades, DYNAMITE RAVE has been rerecorded and contains new lyrics and vocals. The original and all remixes of DYNAMITE RAVE as well as END OF THE CENTURY have been removed for the same reason in the North American and European arcade releases Dance Dance Revolution X, although the original version and "AIR" Special's charts were kept for the new version.

Music
New music from the North American PlayStation 2 version of Dance Dance Revolution X:

"30 Lives (Up-Up-Down-Dance Mix)"
"Always on My Mind"
"Big Girls Don't Cry"
"Boy (DJ Irene Rockstar Mix)"
"Boys (2008 X-Edit)"
"Butterfly (2008 X-Edit)"
"Dance Celebration"
"Dance Celebration (System 7 Remix)"
"Dance Floor"
"Dream Machine"
"Dub-I-Dub (2008 X-Edit)"
"Feel"
"Flight of the Phoenix"
"Get Up'N Move (2008 X-edit)"
"Ghetto Blasta Deluxe"
"Happy"
"Here It Goes Again"
"Here We Go"
"Hero (2008 X-edit)"
"Horatio"
"Inspiration"
"Lift You Up"
"Make Me Cry"
"On the Break"
"On the Bounce"
"Open"
"Party Lights"
"Playa (Original Mix)"
"Put 'Em Up"
"Reach Up"
"Saber Wing"
"Saber Wing (Akira Ishihara Headshot Mix)"
"Slip Out"
"Slip Out (Bounce in Beat Mix)"
"Sound of Freedom"
"Swingin"
"Synthesized"
"Taj He Spitz"
"Taj He Spitz (Tommie Sunshine's Brooklyn Fire Re-Touch)"
"Take a Chance"
"Ticket to Bombay"
"Till The Lonely's Gone"
"Tracers (4Beat Remix)"
"Trigger"
"U Can't Touch This"
"Waiting 4 U"
"We Come Alive"
"We've Got To Make It Tonight"
"Wine Red (Tommie Sunshine's Brooklyn Fire Retouch)"
"Xmix1 (Midnight Dawn)"
"Xmix2 (Beats 'n Bangs)"
"Xmix3 (Stomp Dem Groove)"
"Xmix4 (Linear Momentum)"
"Xmix5 (Overcrush)"

Soundtrack
The original soundtrack for Dance Dance Revolution X was released in Japan on January 29, 2009, coinciding with the release of the PlayStation 2 version of X. The soundtrack consists of 3 CDs, which feature the songs from the game, songs from the Wii release Full Full Party (the Japanese version of Hottest Party 2) and a nonstop megamix disc. Pre-orders of the PlayStation 2 version of X will come with the album.

Downloads
Dance Celebration, Flourish, Party Lights, and Flight of the Phoenix became available to purchase on Konami's mobile music download service on December 23, 2008.

See also
List of Dance Dance Revolution songs

References

Dance Dance Revolution X